Pablo Maximiliano Lemos Merladett (born 17 December 1993) is a Uruguayan footballer who plays as a midfielder for Rentistas in the Uruguayan Primera División.

Career

Rentistas
Prior to the 2020 season, Lemos moved to Rentistas from Deportivo Maldonado. He made his league debut for the club on 16 February 2020, coming on as a 55th minute substitute for Bryan Bautista in a 2-0 home victory over Nacional.

References

External links
Maximiliano Lemos at Copa Libertadores

1993 births
Living people
Uruguayan footballers
Uruguayan expatriate footballers
Juventud de Las Piedras players
Villa Teresa players
Club Alianza Lima footballers
Deportivo Maldonado players
C.A. Rentistas players
Uruguayan Primera División players
Uruguayan Segunda División players
Peruvian Primera División players
Association football midfielders
Uruguayan expatriate sportspeople in Peru
Expatriate footballers in Peru